Jessica Alice Cave Lloyd (born 5 May 1987) is an English actress, comedian and cartoonist, known for her role as Lavender Brown in the Harry Potter film series and for her shows in London and at the Edinburgh Fringe. She has also published a book of cartoon doodles called Love Sick, some of the designs in which have appeared on greeting cards. A comedic play based on her life and relationships, Sunrise, was first performed in 2019. Cave's first novel, Sunset, was published in 2021.

Early life
Cave was born on 5 May 1987 in London, the second of five siblings. Her father works as a general practitioner. Her mother Deborah is the daughter of former Chief Secretary to Hong Kong, Tasmanian-born Sir Charles Philip Haddon-Cave. Her youngest sister Bebe Cave is also an actress.

She attended Latymer Upper School in Hammersmith for Sixth Form. A former county-level swimmer and ex-national tennis player, she studied illustration and animation at Kingston University, dropping out aged 19. Her tennis career was cut short by injury when she was 15. In 2020, she revealed that she had been raped by her tennis coach at the age of 14. She had originally intended to study stage management at the Royal Academy of Dramatic Arts, and worked in London as a stagehand, before deciding to pursue acting.

Career
Cave made her acting debut in the drama Summerhill, shown on CBBC in early 2008.

She won the role of Lavender Brown in the film Harry Potter and the Half-Blood Prince through an open casting call held on 1 July 2007. Cave, who came from an agency, beat over 7,000 girls who turned up for the audition. She also performed the voice of Lavender in the video-game adaptations of Harry Potter and the Half-Blood Prince and Harry Potter and the Deathly Hallows: Part 2.

In June 2009, she made her West End début, playing "Thomasina" in a revival of Tom Stoppard's Arcadia at the Duke of York's Theatre. That December, Cave had a minor role in the 2009 film Inkheart as a water nymph.

She appeared in the play Breed at Theatre503, playing the role of Liv, from 21 September to 16 October 2010. She won the Off West-End stage award for People's Choice for Female Performance.

On 4 February 2011, she appeared as a one-off character Hermione in the CBBC children's drama Sadie J.

Cave runs the website Pindippy, and its associated YouTube channel of the same name, which feature short videos written by and starring Cave herself, with occasional appearances from some of her other Harry Potter co-stars, including her close friend, Evanna Lynch.

She played the title character in a 2012 production of J. M. Barrie's Mary Rose at the DogOrange Theatre, in London. That same year she appeared as Zazzy in the final episode of season 2 of Grandma's House, which aired on 24 May 2012, and in the role of Elder Biddy in the 2012 film adaptation of Great Expectations, based on the novel by Charles Dickens, and directed by Mike Newell. During the filming of Great Expectations, Cave worked alongside her younger sister Bebe (who played the younger Biddy), and was also reunited with her Harry Potter co-stars Helena Bonham Carter, Robbie Coltrane, and Ralph Fiennes. By June 2012, Cave had amassed over 30,000 followers on her Twitter account.

Cave has appeared in several minor television roles. She appeared as a waitress named Angela in a medieval restaurant in the second series of BBC Three's Pramface, which aired on 8 January 2013. She appeared as Theodora Snitch, a character in YouTube's one-off revival of the TV series Knightmare; Denise in episode 2 of Coming Up Series 8; as Alicia Ferguson in the CBBC series Wizards vs Aliens, in the two-part episode "The Thirteenth Floor"; as Anne-Marie Bonner in series 2 of The Job Lot, and as Annie Maddocks in the E4 drama Glue in 2014. She has appeared as herself in game shows, including 8 Out of 10 Cats Does Countdown in 2017 and Richard Osman's House of Games in November 2021.

In August, 2012, Cave made her debut at the Edinburgh Festival Fringe with her show, Bookworm, which is described as "a charming hour of character comedy and loving literary silliness inspired by the obsessive Potter fans" Cave encountered while starring in the Harry Potter films. In the show, Cave stars as the bossy leader of a book club named Bookworms United, whose sidekick is played by her younger sister, Bebe. Cave's character expresses her enthusiasm for topics ranging from Babar to Andre Agassi's autobiography through a combination of homemade props and shadow puppetry, which conceal the character's neurosis, and contrast with a subplot about an ex-boyfriend. 

Her 2018 Edinburgh Fringe show Sunrise was described as an "emotionally intelligent [and] honest" performance. Sunrise received widespread praise and rave reviews, and has since been published as a playtext by Nick Hern Books. She also does regular comedy shows at venues in Soho, London.

Other activities
In 2012, Cave created a fashion range of colourful boho-chic harem-style pants, called "Cave Pants". She also published a book of cartoons called Lovesick on 2 July 2015 through Ebury Publishing. These cartoons have also been made into a greeting card range published by Cardmix.

Cave and her sister, actor Bebe Cave, began a podcast in 2020, We Can't Talk About That Right Now.

Personal life
Cave is in a relationship with comedian Alfie Brown, son of composer Steve Brown and impressionist Jan Ravens. They have four children: a son born in October 2014, a daughter born in July 2016, a second son born in October 2020, and a third son born in March 2022.

The couple's relationship inspired Cave's 2015 Edinburgh Festival Fringe comedy hit I Loved Her. They broke up after the birth of their second child, and Cave explored their breakup and co-parenting experience in her 2018 show Sunrise. In 2018, Cave and Brown, who were separated at the time, took part in Comedy Central's Roast Battle. The couple eventually reconciled.

In January 2021, Cave's third child was treated in hospital after testing positive for COVID-19. In February 2022, Cave tested positive for COVID-19 while pregnant with her fourth child. The following month, she was admitted to hospital where she gave birth.

Filmography

Television

Film

Video games

Authored works
 Sunset, Welbeck Publishing Group, 2021.

References

External links
 
 
 
 

1987 births
Living people
Actresses from London
English film actresses
English television actresses
People associated with Kingston University
21st-century English actresses
English people of Australian descent
English cartoonists
English women comedians
English YouTubers